Soran University (SU) is a KRG sponsored public university, founded in 2009. It is located in Soran, Iraqi Kurdistan.

Faculties
SU has five faculties: 
Faculty of Arts
Faculty of Law
Faculty of Science
Faculty of Education
Faculty of Engineering (Civil, Petroleum, Chemical) Engineering

Staff
Key staff members include:

1. President: Asst. Prof. Dr. Sherwan Sharif Qurtas

 Vice-president for Administrative and Financial affairs: Asst. Prof. Dr. Sherzad Saeed Sedeeq
 Vice-president for scientific affairs: Prof. Dr. Sirwan Zand
 Vice-president for Students' affairs : Dr. Rizgar Saed Hussein
 Asst. Prof. Dr. Ayad Nuri Faqi Dean of Faculty of Science
 Dr. Ali Yousif Azeez Dean of Faculty of Education
 Dr. Himdad Faysal Ahmad Dean of Faculty of Law
 Dr. Jamal Ismael Kakrasul Dean of Faculty of Engineering
 Dr. Karmand Abdulla Hamad Dean of Faculty of Arts
 Prof. Dr. Samir Mustafa Dean of Scientific Research Centre

External links
 

Universities in Kurdistan Region (Iraq)
Erbil Governorate
Public universities
Educational institutions established in 2009
2009 establishments in Iraqi Kurdistan